High Explosive is a 1943 American drama film directed by Frank McDonald and written by Maxwell Shane and Howard J. Green for Pine-Thomas Productions. The film stars Chester Morris, Jean Parker, Barry Sullivan, Ralph Sanford, Rand Brooks and Dick Purcell. The film was released on March 27, 1943, by Paramount Pictures.

Plot

Cast 
Chester Morris as Buzz Mitchell
Jean Parker as Connie Baker
Barry Sullivan as Mike Douglas
Ralph Sanford as Squinchy Andrews
Rand Brooks as Jimmy Baker
Dick Purcell as Dave
Barbara Lynn as Doris Lynch
Allan Bryon as Joe

Production
The film was based on a story by Joseph Hoffman, You Can't Live Forever. Pine-Thomas Productions purchased it in April 1942 as a vehicle for Chester Morris.

The film was also known as Nitro Trucks Howard Green wrote the script and Jean Parker was signed to costar.

Filming started in August 1942. The film gave an early role to Barry Sullivan. It was retitled High Explosive by December 1942.

References

External links 
 
High Explosive at TCMDB
High Explosive at BFI
Review of film at Variety

1943 films
Paramount Pictures films
American drama films
1943 drama films
Films directed by Frank McDonald
Films scored by Daniele Amfitheatrof
1940s English-language films
1940s American films